The Dagny Johnson Key Largo Hammock Botanical State Park is a Florida State Park, located in the center of Key Largo in the Florida Keys, on County Road 905, one-quarter mile north of its intersection with the Overseas Highway (US 1).

The park's name honors Dagny Johnson, a local environmentalist activist, and is constructed on land bought up in 1982 after the financial demise of Port Bougainville, a project which would have included 15 hotels and over 2000 condos. The park is an important habitat for the threatened Key Largo Woodrat and the Key Largo Cotton Mouse, which are found only in this part of Key Largo: 90% of these animals' habitat is in the Dagny Johnson Park and the adjacent Crocodile Lake National Wildlife Refuge.

Admission and hours
There is a $2.50 per person entrance fee. Florida state parks are open between 8 a.m. and sundown every day of the year (including holidays).

Gallery

References

External links
 Dagny Johnson Key Largo Hammock Botanical State Park at Florida State Parks

State parks of Florida
Parks in Monroe County, Florida
Protected areas established in 1982
1982 establishments in Florida